Line 6 (Italian: Linea sei) is a  light metro line that forms part of the Naples Metro. It connects 4 stations. The line is currently closed to the public due to low ridership. It has been closed since 2013.

When the planned expansion of Line 6 is completed, there will be a total of 8 stations along a planned  route. The line is projected to reopen in 2024.

History 
What was to become Line 6 was originally planned as a rapid tramway line (Linea Tranviaria Rapida, LTR) with some below ground tracts. Works started in the late 1980s. The first section was planned to be opened for the 1990 FIFA World Cup. Since the Mergellina terminal station could not be completed in time the line was not opened and was left unused for many years.

In the 2000s it was decided to complete the Mergellina station and to open the section that had already been built, but as a light metro without any connection with the tram network. The section was opened on 4 February 2007 from the Mostra to the Mergellina stations with two intermediate stations at Lala and Augusto and a frequency of a train every 8 minutes. 

Since the existing section was very short and the area was already served by other parallel lines, (Line 2 and Cumana), the line was underused. The service was suspended on 10 March 2011 and was later re-opened with a reduced frequency and only in the morning from Mondays to Fridays.

The Line was run by Metronapoli until November 2013 when the running of the Naples Metro was taken over by  Azienda Napoletana Mobilità SpA (ANM).  All service on line 6 has been suspended since 2013, following a building collapse that affected the tunnel. It is projected to reopen in June 2024.

Expansion 
The line will be extended from the west of Naples to the city center, at Municipio station.

In July 2006, preliminary work towards the Municipio station, where work on the Line 1 station was already under way, began. In September 2007, Ansaldo STS was awarded a €426m contract for the  Mergellina–Municipio section.

As of now, the line is closed to the public until the extension of the line is completed, which is projected for mid-2024.

Stations

Service 
Trains on Line 6 formerly travelled every 16 minutes, only in the mornings from Mondays to Saturdays. But ridership on the operational tract of the line was low and the line is currently closed.

See also 
 Naples Metro
 List of Naples Metro stations
 Art Stations of the Naples Metro
 List of metro systems

References

Bibliography 
 Guido Mazzuolo: La linea tranviaria rapida a Napoli. Sintesi del progetto. In: ″Ingegneria Ferroviaria″, October 1984, p. 680–685.
 Riccardo Carugati: Tram rapido a Napoli. In: ″I Treni Oggi″, July–August 1990, p. 31–33.
 Marcello Cruciani, Roberto Zannotti: ″Mondiale″ un anno dopo – 2. In: ″I Treni Oggi″ Nr. 117 (July–August 1991), p. 27–28.

External links

 Metro (official site from AMN) 
 Napoli at UrbanRail.net
 Fan page 

Naples Metro lines
Railway lines opened in 2007